Irgendwie anders is the second studio album by German singer Wincent Weiss. It was released by Vertigo Berlin on 29 March 2019 in German-speaking Europe.

Track listing

Charts

Weekly charts

Year-end charts

Certifications

Release history

References

2019 albums
Wincent Weiss albums